Getting Mother's Body: A Novel is the 2003 debut novel by Suzan-Lori Parks. It reimagines William Faulkner's As I Lay Dying as about an African American family in  Texas in 1963.

References 

2003 American novels
2003 debut novels